A white elephant is a possession that its owner cannot dispose of, and whose cost, particularly that of maintenance, is out of proportion to its usefulness. In modern usage, it is a metaphor used to describe an object, construction project, scheme, business venture, facility, etc. considered expensive but without equivalent utility or value relative to its capital (acquisition) and/or operational (maintenance) costs.

Background

The term derives from the sacred white elephants kept by Southeast Asian monarchs in Burma, Thailand (Siam), Laos and Cambodia. To possess a white elephant was regarded—and is still regarded in Thailand and Burma—as a sign that the monarch reigned with justice and power, and that the kingdom was blessed with peace and prosperity. The opulence expected of anyone who owned a beast of such stature was great. Monarchs often exemplified their possession of white elephants in their formal titles (e.g., Hsinbyushin,  and the third monarch of the Konbaung dynasty). Because the animals were considered sacred and laws protected them from labor, receiving a gift of a white elephant from a monarch was simultaneously a blessing and a curse. It was a blessing because the animal was sacred and a sign of the monarch's favour, and a curse because the recipient now had an expensive-to-maintain animal he could not give away and could not put to much practical use.

In the West, the term "white elephant", relating to an expensive burden that fails to meet expectations, was first used in the 17th century and became widespread in the 19th century. According to one source it was popularized following P. T. Barnum's experience with an elephant named Toung Taloung that he billed as the "Sacred White Elephant of Burma".  After much effort and great expense, Barnum finally acquired the animal from the King of Siam only to discover that his "white elephant" was actually dirty grey in color with a few pink spots.

The expressions "white elephant" and "gift of a white elephant" came into common use in the middle of the nineteenth century. The phrase was attached to "white elephant swaps" and "white elephant sales" in the early twentieth century.  Many church bazaars held "white elephant sales" where donors could unload unwanted bric-à-brac, generating profit from the phenomenon that "one man’s trash is another man’s treasure" and the term has continued to be used in this context.

In modern usage, the term now often refers in addition to an extremely expensive building project that fails to deliver on its function or becomes very costly to maintain. Examples include prestigious but uneconomic infrastructure projects such as airports, dams, bridges, shopping malls and football stadiums. The American Oakland Athletics baseball team has used a white elephant as a symbol and usually its main or alternate logo since 1902, originally in sarcastic defiance of John McGraw's 1902 characterization of the new team as a "white elephant". The Dubai Central airport has also been named a white elephant. In Singapore, paper cutouts of white elephants were placed next to the completed but unopened Buangkok MRT station in 2005, leading to a police investigation.

The term has also been applied to outdated or underperforming military projects like the U.S. Navy's Alaska-class cruiser. In Austria, the term "white elephant" means workers who have little or no use, but are not terminable.

See also
 White elephant gift exchange
 Hills Like White Elephants
 Bridge to nowhere
 Escalation of commitment (sunk cost fallacy)
 Pork barrel
Abul-Abbas

References

Further reading
  Contains a chapter on the white elephant in Southeast Asia.
  Contains a long chapter on how Burmese generals tried to use the white elephant to consolidate power, also looks at the cosmological origins of the animal.

External links 

 

English-language idioms
Metaphors referring to elephants
Public choice theory